The Sea Witch is a record setting artificial fishing lure made by C&H Lures.  It has been in production since 1925.   It is recommended for trolling for billfish and dolphin.

Records
In 1987, it was used to catch the world-record Spanish mackerel.
In 2014, it was used to catch the Maryland state record Wahoo.

References

Recreational fishing
Fishing equipment